Väinö Liikkanen (1 November 1903 – 15 October 1957) was a Finnish cross-country skier who competed in the 1932 Winter Olympics. He won a silver medal in the 50 km and finished ninth in the 18 km event. He also won two medals at the FIS Nordic World Ski Championships with a gold in the 4 × 10 km relay in 1935 and a bronze in the 18 km in 1933; in 1933 he also placed fourth over 50 km, despite winning the 50 km race at the national championships. He was a forester by profession.

Cross-country skiing results
All results are sourced from the International Ski Federation (FIS).

Olympic Games
 1 medal – (1 silver)

World Championships
 2 medals – (1 gold, 1 bronze)

References

External links

 

1903 births
1957 deaths
People from Virolahti
People from Viipuri Province (Grand Duchy of Finland)
Finnish male cross-country skiers
Olympic cross-country skiers of Finland
Cross-country skiers at the 1932 Winter Olympics
Olympic silver medalists for Finland
Olympic medalists in cross-country skiing
FIS Nordic World Ski Championships medalists in cross-country skiing
Medalists at the 1932 Winter Olympics
Sportspeople from Kymenlaakso
20th-century Finnish people